Atropates ( and Middle Persian ;  ; c. 370 BC - after 321 BC) was a Persian nobleman who served Darius III, then Alexander the Great, and eventually founded an independent kingdom and dynasty that was named after him.

Biography 
Towards the end of the Achaemenid Empire, Atropates was governor (satrap) of the Achaemenid province of Media. In the decisive Battle of Gaugamela (October 331 BCE) between Darius and Alexander, Atropates commanded the Achaemenid troops of Media and Sacasene.

Following his defeat in that battle, Darius fled to the Median capital of Ecbatana, where Atropates gave him hospitality. Darius attempted to raise a new army but was forced to flee Ecbatana in June 330 BCE. After Darius' death a month later at the hands of Bessus, Atropates surrendered to Alexander. Alexander initially chose Oxydates as satrap of Media, but in 328-327 BCE after a period of two years Alexander lost trust in Oxydates' loyalty, and Atropates was reinstated to his old position. In 325-324, Atropates delivered Baryaxes (a sought-after rebel of the region) to Alexander while the latter was at Pasargadae. Alexander's esteem for the governor rose so high that soon afterwards Atropates' daughter was married to Alexander's confidant and cavalry commander Perdiccas at the famous mass wedding at Susa in February 324 BCE.

Later that year, Alexander visited Atropates in Ecbatana with his good friend and second-in-command Hephaestion, who fell ill and died in October 324 BCE. At this time, "[i]t was related by some authors, that Atropates on one occasion presented Alexander with a hundred women, said to be Amazons; but Arrian ([Anabasis] vii. 13) disbelieved the story."

Alexander himself died eight months later on June 10, 323 BCE, and Atropates' new son-in-law Perdiccas was named regent of Alexander's half-brother Philip III. Following the "Partition of Babylon" in 323 BCE, Media was divided into two parts: the greater portion in the south-east was to be governed by Peithon, a general of Perdiccas, while a smaller portion in the north west (principally around the Araxes River basin) was given to Atropates. At some point thereafter, Atropates refused to convey allegiance to the diadochi and made his part of Media an independent kingdom, while his son-in-law Perdiccas was eventually murdered by Peithon in the summer of 320 BCE.

Legacy
The dynasty Atropates founded would rule the kingdom for several centuries, at first either independently or as vassals of the Seleucids, then as vassals of the Arsacids, into whose house they are said to have married. They became, however, the new House of Parthia through the marriage of the Arsacid heiress to the Atropatenid heir.

The region that encompassed Atropates' kingdom come to be known to the Greeks as "Media Atropatene" after Atropates, and eventually simply "Atropatene". The Arsacids called it 'Aturpatakan' in Parthian, as did also the Sassanids who eventually succeeded them. Eventually Middle Iranian 'Aturpatakan' became 'Azerbaijan', whence, according to one etymological theory, the modern nation of Azerbaijan and the Iranian province of Azerbaijan (which province is largely contiguous with the borders of ancient Atropatene) got their names; another theory traces the etymology from the ancient Persian words "Āzar", meaning Fire, and "Pāyegān" meaning Guardian/Protector.

References

Bibliography

Ancient works 
Justin, Epitome of the Philippic History of Pompeius Trogus.
Strabo, Geographica.

Modern works 
 
 

 
 

Satraps of the Alexandrian Empire
Achaemenid satraps of Media
Rulers of Media Atropatene
4th-century BC rulers
Ancient Persian people
4th-century BC Iranian people
Darius III
Atropatene